The Plymouth Congregational Church is a historic church located at 3429 Devon Road corner of Main Highway in the Coconut Grove in Miami, Florida. 

The land was donated by George Spalding and George E. Merrick. The architect was Clinton MacKenzie. 
The Edifice Religious was founded in the 1897, and completed in the 1917, the church was built by a single man, Felix Rebom, using only a hatchet, a trowel, a plumb line, and a T-square.  Its architecture was modeled after the old Spanish missions of Mexico. On April 18, 2012, the AIA's Florida Chapter placed Plymouth Congregational Church on its list of Florida Architecture: 100 Years. 100 Places. On July 23, 1974, it was added to the U.S. National Register of Historic Places.

Circa 1941, the WPA-sponsored American Guide Series book about Miami and environs described the church: "PLYMOUTH CONGREGATIONAL CHURCH, at Ingraham Hwy. and Devon Rd. is a reproduction of a Mexican mission. The interior of the vine-covered stone building is constructed on the lines of a basilica and the doors are said to have come from a Spanish mission in Mexico. In one of the doors is a round cat-hole, now covered with screen. Many outdoor weddings have been performed at the pulpit in the walled garden."

References

External links

Dade County listings at National Register of Historic Places
Florida's Office of Cultural and Historical Programs
Dade County listings
Plymouth Congregational Church

Churches in Miami
National Register of Historic Places in Miami
United Church of Christ churches in Florida
Coconut Grove (Miami)
Historic American Buildings Survey in Florida
1917 establishments in Florida
Churches completed in 1917